Portsmouth is a city in and the county seat of Scioto County, Ohio, United States. The population was 18,252 at the 2020 census. It is the principal city of the Portsmouth micropolitan area.

History

Foundation
The area was occupied by Native Americans as early as 100 BC, as indicated by the Portsmouth Earthworks, a ceremonial center built by the Ohio Hopewell culture between 100 and 500 AD.

According to early 20th-century historian Charles Augustus Hanna, a Shawnee village was founded at the site of modern-day Portsmouth in late 1758, following the destruction of Lower Shawneetown by floods.

European-Americans began to settle in the 1790s after the American Revolutionary War, and the small town of Alexandria was founded. Located at the confluence, Alexandria was flooded numerous times by the Ohio and the Scioto rivers.

In 1796, Emanuel Traxler became the first person to permanently occupy land in what would later be known as Portsmouth, after the United States gained its independence.

In 1803, Henry Massie found a better location slightly east and somewhat removed from the flood plains. He began to plot the new city by mapping the streets and distributing the land. Portsmouth was founded in 1803 and was established as a city in 1815. It was designated as the county seat. Settlers left Alexandria, and it soon disappeared. Massie named Portsmouth after the town of Portsmouth in New Hampshire.

The Ohio state legislature passed "Black Laws" in 1804 that restricted movement of free blacks and required persons to carry papers, in an effort to dissuade blacks from settling in the state. These provisions were intermittently enforced by local governments and law enforcement, and sometimes used as an excuse to force African Americans out of settlements. In 1831, Portsmouth drove out African Americans from the city under this pretext. Many settled several miles north in what became known as Huston's Hollow, along the Scioto River. Its residents, especially Joseph Love and Dan Lucas, provided aid to refugee slaves in the following years and assisted them in moving north.

Although southern Ohio was dominated in number by anti-abolitionist settlers from the South, some whites also worked to improve conditions for blacks and aid refugee slaves. Portsmouth became important in the antebellum years as part of the Underground Railroad. Fugitive slaves from Kentucky and other parts of the South crossed the Ohio River here. Some found their future in Portsmouth; others moved north along the Scioto River to reach Detroit, Michigan, and get further away from slave catchers. Many continued into Canada to secure their freedom. A historical marker near the Grant Bridge commemorates this period of Portsmouth's history. James Ashley of Portsmouth continued his activism and pursued a political career. After being elected to Congress, he wrote the Thirteenth Amendment, which abolished slavery in 1865 after the American Civil War.

Portsmouth quickly developed an industrial base due to its location at the confluence of the Ohio and Scioto rivers. Early industrial growth included having meat packing and shipping facilities for Thomas Worthington's Chillicothe farm, located north of Portsmouth on the Scioto River.  The city's growth was stimulated by completion of the Ohio and Erie Canal in the 1820s and 1830s, which provided access to the Great Lakes, opening up northern markets.

But the construction of the Norfolk and Western (N&W) railyards beginning in 1838 and the completion of the Baltimore and Ohio Railroad (B&O) junction at the city in the late 1850s quickly surpassed the canal in stimulating growth. The railroads soon carried more freight than the canal, with the B&O connecting the city to the Baltimore and Washington, DC markets. By the end of the 19th century, Portsmouth became one of the most important industrial cities on the Ohio River between Pittsburgh, Pennsylvania and Cincinnati, Ohio.  It became an iron and steel factory town with new companies like the Portsmouth Steel Company.

20th century
The city's growth continued. By 1916, during World War I, Portsmouth was listed as being a major industrial and jobbing center, the fourth-largest shoe manufacturing center in the country, and the largest manufacturer of fire and paving bricks in the United States. Wheeling-Pittsburgh Steel (later called Empire-Detroit Steel) employed over one thousand people. There were 100 other manufacturing companies producing goods from furniture to engines.

Such industrial and shipping growth greatly benefited Boneyfiddle (a west-end neighborhood in Portsmouth), where grand buildings were constructed with the wealth from the commerce. As time passed, much of the commerce began to move toward Chillicothe Street, which has continued as the main thoroughfare of Portsmouth. While Boneyfiddle is receiving new life, it is a shadow of its former self.

The city population peaked at just over 42,000 in 1930 (see "Demographics", below). In 1931, the Norfolk Southern Corporation built a grand, art deco passenger station in Portsmouth, that provided a substantial entry to the city. It was located at 16th and Findlay streets. Passengers used the station for access to both interstate and intrastate train lines, which provided basic transportation for many. The widespread availability of affordable automobiles and changing patterns resulted in reduction in rail passenger traffic here and nationally. The station was later used for offices and its keys were turned over to Scioto County in 2003, and the building was demolished in 2004.

Suburbanization also affected the city. By the 1950 census, the population had begun to decline, falling below 40,000. Some of this change was due to the effects of highway construction, which stimulated suburban residential development in the postwar years. But during the late 20th century, foreign competition and industrial restructuring resulted in the loss of most of the industrial jobs on which Portsmouth's economy had been based; the jobs were moved out of the area, with many going overseas.

Further decline occurred in 1980, following the suspension of operations at Empire Detroit Steel's Portsmouth Works, which took place after the sale of the steel plant to Armco Steel. Armco Steel closed the plant because they did not want to replace the obsolete, Open Hearth Furnaces with the more efficient basic oxygen steel furnaces. The plant also needed a continuous caster to replace the obsolete soaking pits and blooming mill in 1995. When the steel mill was closed, 1,300 steelworkers were laid off.

21st century 
As of 2010, Portsmouth has a population of approximately 20,000. It has shared in the loss of jobs due to unskilled labor outsourcing and population migration to more populous urban areas.
Despite its relatively small size, Portsmouth has been a regular stop for recent Presidential campaigns of the 21st century. In September 2004, George W. Bush visited the city as part of his reelection campaign.  Vice Presidential candidate John Edwards also visited Portsmouth that month. The campaigns of 2008 resulted in numerous candidates and surrogates visiting Portsmouth, and some spoke at Shawnee State University: Bill Clinton on behalf of his wife Hillary Clinton, Republican candidate John McCain, and US Senator Barack Obama, who won the election. In 2012, candidate Mitt Romney spoke at Shawnee State University. In March 2016, Bill Clinton visited Portsmouth again to campaign for his wife, presidential candidate Hillary Clinton. In August 2017, US Senator and former presidential candidate, Bernie Sanders, spoke at a rally held at Shawnee State University.

Portsmouth, and other parts of Scioto County, have worked to redevelop blighted properties and create a new economy. Along with adapting disused residential properties, Portsmouth has begun the process of transforming abandoned industrial and commercial properties to other uses.

The city has initiated new developments in its downtown. The Ohio Legislature passed House Bill 233 on April 20, 2016, to authorize cities to create Downtown Redevelopment Districts. They operate similarly to a Tax Increment Finance (TIF) District. The city of Portsmouth formed a Downtown Redevelopment District (DRD) in 2017 in the Boneyfiddle neighborhood of the city to increase investment and development there.

Through the early 21st century, there has been a noticeable increase in investment in Portsmouth's local economy. New investments and developments in the local economy led to Portsmouth's inclusion in Site Selection Magazines "Top 10 Micropolitan areas". Celina, Defiance and Portsmouth were among a group of cities tied for 10th. Portsmouth attracted nine significant economic development projects in 2016, nearly as many as it had from 2004 to 2013 combined.

In 2014, Portsmouth was one of 350 cities to enter a submission in the America's Best Communities competition, hoping to win the $3 million first place prize. In April 2015, Portsmouth was chosen as one of the 50 quarter-finalists, winning $50,000 to help prepare a Community Revitalization Plan. In January 2016, Portsmouth's plan, which emphasized using its most valuable asset, the Ohio River, as a key to revitalizing the city, earned it one of 15 spots in the competition's semi-finals.  In April 2016, Portsmouth was one of seven cities eliminated at the semi-final round, but received an additional $25,000 for use in continuing to develop its plans to improve commercial and community access to the Portsmouth riverfront by making the port a premier regional destination for industrial development, small business development, and riverfront recreation.

In 2019, Portsmouth was named Hallmarks' Hometown Christmas Town. The Friends of Portsmouth group held the annual Winterfest celebration event that brought Christmas lights, vendors, ice skating, carriage rides, tree lighting, and more to Market Square.

In 2020 the National Civic League named Portsmouth as an "All-American City," along with nine other cities.

Demographics

2010 census
As of the census of 2010, there were 20,226 people, 8,286 households, and 4,707 families residing in the city. The racial makeup of the city was 90.1% White, 5.1% African American, 0.4% Native American, 0.6% Asian, 0.7% from other races, and 3.0% from two or more races. Hispanic or Latino of any race were 2.2% of the population.

There were 8,286 households, out of which 28.5% had children under the age of 18 living with them, 33.9% were married couples living together, 17.5% had a female householder with no husband present, 5.4% had a male householder with no wife present, and 43.2% were non-families. 35.9% of all households were made up of individuals, and 15.5% had someone living alone who was 65 years of age or older. The average household size was 2.28 and the average family size was 2.93.

The median age in the city was 36.1 years. 21.6% of residents were under the age of 18; 14.3% were between the ages of 18 and 24; 23.6% were from 25 to 44; 24.2% were from 45 to 64; and 16.4% were 65 years of age or older. The gender makeup of the city was 46.4% male and 53.6% female.

2000 census
As of the census of 2000, there were 20,909 people, 9,120 households, and 5,216 families residing in the city. The population density was 1,941.4 people per square mile (749.6/km2). There were 10,248 housing units at an average density of 951.5 per square mile
(367.4/km2). The racial makeup of the city was 91.50% White, 5.00% African American, 0.63% Native American, 0.61% Asian, 0.02% Pacific Islander, 0.32% from other races, and 1.92% from two or more races. Hispanic or Latino of any race were 0.93% of the population.

There were 9,120 households, out of which 25.9% had children under the age of 18 living with them, 37.9% were married couples living together, 15.6% had a female householder with no husband present, and 42.8% were non-families. 37.3% of all households were made up of individuals, and 17.8% had someone living alone who was 65 years of age or older. The average household size was 2.19 and the average family size was 2.87.

In the city the population was spread out, with 22.0% under the age of 18, 11.3% from 18 to 24, 25.9% from 25 to 44, 21.2% from 45 to 64, and 19.6% who were 65 years of age or older. The median age was 38 years. For every 100 females, there were 83.8 males. For every 100 females age 18 and over, there were 78.3 males.

The median income for a household in the city was $23,004, and the median income for a family was $31,237. Males had a median income of $31,521 versus $20,896 for females. The per capita income for the city was $15,078. About 18.3% of families and 23.6% of the population were below the poverty line, including 31.1% of those under age 18 and 14.5% of those age 65 or over.

Geography

Portsmouth is at the confluence of the Ohio, Scioto, and Little Scioto rivers. It is a midway point among four major cities: Charleston, West Virginia, Cincinnati and Columbus, Ohio; and Lexington, Kentucky, each of which are approximately ninety miles away (roughly a two-hour drive).

Much of the terrain is quite hilly due to dissected plateau around it. Both rivers have carved valleys and Portsmouth lies next to both the Scioto and Ohio rivers. It is within the ecoregion of the Western Allegheny Plateau.

Neighborhoods
North Moreland - a community within Portsmouth, north of the Village of New Boston. North Moreland connects the larger western section of Portsmouth with Sciotoville.  
Boneyfiddle - several blocks west of downtown Portsmouth, generally centered around the Market St./2nd St. intersection
Hilltop - residential neighborhoods in Portsmouth located north of 17th St., west of Thomas Ave and east of Scioto Trail

Climate
Portsmouth has a hot-summer humid continental climate (Dfa) closely bordering a humid subtropical climate (Cfa.) Average monthly temperatures range from 31.8 °F in January to 75.1 °F in July. PRISM Climate Group at Oregon State University

Government

City government

The city charter was adopted on November 6, 1928. The city conducts business at their city hall, which was constructed in 1935. City council meetings are held during the second and fourth weeks in the month. The city reverted from being run by a city manager to a mayor in 1988, with the mayor being elected every four years.

In 2012, voters approved returning to a Council/City Manager form of government; this took effect in January 2014. Under the City Manager/Council system, the mayor and vice-mayor are elected members of the city council who are appointed to their positions by the council. The city manager is hired by and reports directly to the council. The city manager oversees the day-to-day operations of city government and is the direct supervisor of all city department heads. There are six wards in the city with elections of council members from the wards every two years.

The City Manager is Sam Sutherland.

County government

Portsmouth is the county seat for Scioto County. The courthouse is located at the corner of Sixth and Court Streets and was constructed in 1936. The sheriff's office and county jail, once located in the courthouse, are located in a new facility, constructed in 2006 at the former site of the Norfolk and Western rail depot near U.S. 23.

County Commissioners:

Scottie Powell, Chairman

Bryan K. Davis

Cathy E. Coleman

The county commissioners meet twice weekly on Tuesday and Thursdays at 9:30 am in room 107 on the first floor of the Scioto County Courthouse.

Response to the opioid epidemic 
In the late 1990s, an opioid epidemic of prescription drug abuse had swept the region. This caused an accelerated increase in social instability and crime. One of the most prevalent drugs was oxycodone, a synthetic opiate known colloquially as oxy.

In May 2011, the Ohio Senate and House unanimously passed a bill (signed into law by John Kasich) authored by Portsmouth's state representative Dr. Terry Johnson, cracking down on pill mills. Shortly thereafter, the DEA, state and local law enforcement agencies worked to identify and shut down a pharmacy and several doctors who had prescribed hundreds of thousands of opiates over a two-year period by suspending their license to practice medicine.

In a May 2019 investigative story, The Washington Post reported that fentanyl had been replacing oxycodone as the preferred opioid.

Economy
Portsmouth major employers include Southern Ohio Medical Center, Kings Daughters Medical Center Ohio, Shawnee State University, Norfolk Southern Corp.(Railroad), Southern Ohio Correctional Facility and OSCO Industries.  In November 2002, the Portsmouth Gaseous Diffusion Plant in nearby Piketon, Ohio was recognized as a Nuclear Historic Landmark by the American Nuclear Society. It had served a military function from 1952 until the mid-1960s, when the mission changed from enriching uranium for nuclear weapons to one focused on producing fuel for commercial nuclear power plants. The Portsmouth Gaseous Diffusion Plant ended enriching operations in 2001 and began to support operational and administrative functions and perform external contract work. The site is currently being cleaned up for future development by Fluor/ B&W.

Graf Brothers Flooring and Lumber, the world's largest manufacturer of rift and quartered oak products, has two satellite log yards in Portsmouth, with the company's main office being located across the river in South Shore, Kentucky. Portsmouth is the home of Sole Choice Inc., one of the largest manufacturers of shoelaces in the world.

Transportation

Highways
Portsmouth is served by two major U.S. Routes: 23 and 52. Other significant roads include Ohio State Routes 73, 104,
139, 140, and 335. The nearest Interstate highway is I-64.
Interstate 73 is planned to use the newly built Portsmouth bypass (i.e., Ohio State Route 823) en route from North Carolina To Michigan. The I-74 Extension is planned to use US 52 through Portsmouth, running concurrently with I-73 on the eastern side of Portsmouth

Rail

Portsmouth is an important location in the Norfolk Southern Railway network. Norfolk Southern operates a railyard and locomotive maintenance facility for its long-distance shipping route between the coalfields of West Virginia and points east, to the Great Lakes. Competitor CSX Transportation operates a former Chesapeake & Ohio Railway line just east of the city in Sciotoville, which crosses the Ohio River on the historic Sciotoville Bridge. Amtrak offers passenger service to the Portsmouth area on its Cardinal route between New York City and Chicago. The passenger station is located on CSX Transportation-owned track in South Shore, Kentucky, across the Ohio River from Portsmouth.

Air
Portsmouth is served by the Greater Portsmouth Regional Airport (PMH), a general aviation airport.

Public transportation
Public transportation for Portsmouth and its outlying areas is offered through Access Scioto County (ASC).

Education

Shawnee State University
Shawnee State University is a public university and the southernmost member of the University System of Ohio. In 1945, Ohio University established an academic center in Portsmouth. In 1986, a legislative charter introduced by Vern Riffe to establish Shawnee State University was signed into law by Governor Richard Celeste. Shawnee State University offers associate's and bachelor's degrees in a variety of disciplines. They rank 9th nationwide according to The Princeton Review for their undergraduate degrees in Game design. Other popular majors are Nursing, Business Administration, Sociology, Biology, and Psychology. They also offer 7 master's degrees and one doctorate. SSU, also has student and faculty exchange programs with several overseas institutions, including the Jaume I University in Spain, Al Akhawayn University in Morocco, Zhejiang University of Technology in China, and the Ludwigsburg University of Education in Germany. SSU serves almost 3,000 matriculated undergraduates, as well as several hundred grad and post grad students.

Located in downtown Portsmouth, SSU has a 62-acre campus. Its 28 buildings  include the Vern Riffe Center for the Arts, Clark Planetarium, Morris University Center, and James A. Rhodes Athletic Center. The university's library was named the Clark Memorial Library in 1997. Shawnee State University's Clyde W. Clark Planetarium features the Hubble Space Telescope Viewspace system. The university has on-campus housing for 934 students. All first-year students must live in university housing unless they are married, veterans, over age 23, or living with their parents.

The Shawnee State "Bears" are part of the National Association of Intercollegiate Athletics (NAIA), competing in the Mid-South Conference (MSC) since the 2010  The SSU Bears compete in 13 intercollegiate varsity sports including: Baseball, Basketball, Cross country, Golf, Soccer, Tennis, Track and field, and Volleyball. In March 2021, the Men's basketball team defeated Lewis–Clark State to become NAIA national champions.

Clubs on campus include the Art Club, Chemistry Club, Fantanime, Geology Club, History Club, International Game Developer's Association (IGDA), Political Science Club, Pre-Med Club, and Sexuality and Gender Acceptance (SAGA). and an international group, the Other World Society. In addition, since 2008, except during the COVID-19 Lockdown, the Zombie Education Defense club has hosted a semi-annual, campus wide, week-long, massive game of nerf tag: the Humans vs. Zombies event.

K-12 schools

Portsmouth has one public and two private school systems (the Notre Dame schools and the Portsmouth STEM Academy). The Portsmouth
City School District has served the city since its founding in the 1830s and is the public school in the city. Portsmouth City School District is notable having a storied basketball tradition by winning four OSHAA State Basketball Championships in 1931, 1961, 1978, and 1988. The Trojan basketball team has made 14 final four appearances, they are: 1925, 1926, 1927, 1929, 1931 (1st), 1934 (2nd), 1939, 1941, 1961 (1st), 1978 (1st), 1980 (2nd), 1988 (1st), 1990 (2nd). and 2012 (2nd).  The Trojan football team has also produced some notable teams as of late with an Associated Press Division 3 State Championship in 2000, a regional title, and state semi-final appearance in 2000, and finishing as regional runner up in both 2001, and 2002. In all the Trojans football team has sent 5 teams to the post season since 2000, as of the start of the 2009 season.

In 2000, Portsmouth voters passed a much needed school bond issue, which helped construct new schools for the district. The new schools opened for the 2006–2007 school year. These schools won the Grand Prize from School Planning & Management's 2007 Education Design Showcase. The award is awarded annually to the K-12 school that displays "excellence in design and functional planning directed toward meeting the needs of the educational program." In addition, the school system plans to build a new $10 million athletic complex.
Portsmouth High School has an award-winning Interactive Media program that has won multiple awards for both video and graphic design. The class is under the direction of Chris Cole and the
students run the local cable station TNN CH25.

In 2009, the school system completed construction on a new $10 million athletic complex. The  Clark Athletic Complex has a new football field, baseball field, softball field, tennis courts, and track. The complex is named for Clyde and Maycel Clark of the Clark Foundation, major financial contributors for the construction of the facility. The new complex, situated on the site of the former high school building and across the street from the current high school, has three paintings by mural artist Herb Roe, a 1992 Portsmouth High School alumnus. The murals depict three of the sports played at the new facility: baseball, tennis, and football.

Notre Dame High School, formerly Portsmouth Central Catholic High School, has served the city's Roman Catholics and others since 1852. It is also notable for it's
football team, founded in 1929. It won two state championships in 1967 and 1970.

Culture

Buildings and landmarks

Many historical buildings in Portsmouth have been demolished because of poor upkeep, other city development, or the completion of new buildings that replaced the landmarks. Landmarks that have been demolished include the old Norfolk & Western rail depot, churches dating back to the early 20th century, houses dating to the 1850s, Grant Middle School, and the old Portsmouth High School and various elementary schools.

Many buildings survive from the early 19th century. Old churches are among the reminders of Portsmouth's past and identity. The historic 1910 Columbia Theater was destroyed by a fire in 2007, later demolished and rebuilt in 2012 as the open air Columbia Music Hall, with a refurbished façade from the original structure serving as the entry point. Other noted historic buildings include the old monastery, which can be seen for miles, and Spartan Stadium, as well as numerous buildings in the Boneyfiddle Historic District, which is listed on the National Register of Historic Places. In 1982, students from Miami University conducted research on several of Portsmouth's most important historic buildings. This work resulted in an exhibition at the Miami University Art Museum and a book entitled Portsmouth: Architecture in an Ohio River Town.
The Portsmouth Public Library is the city's library, founded in 1879. It has branch libraries throughout Scioto County. The Southern Ohio Museum, founded in 1979, has more than sixty exhibits on display including artwork by Clarence Holbrook Carter and Jesse Stuart, China dolls, Native American artifacts, and works by local artists.

In October 2016, a professor at Shawnee State University submitted a proposal to the State Farm Neighborhood Assist grant program, to preserve Spartan Municipal Stadium. The stadium opened in 1930 as the original home of the Portsmouth Spartans, now the fifth oldest active franchise in the National Football League (as the Detroit Lions). In November 2016, the city won a $25,000 State Farm Neighborhood Assist grant toward the stadium's renovation.

City parks
Portsmouth has fourteen parks for residents and community use. These include Alexandria Park (Ohio and Scioto River confluence), Bannon Park (near Farley Square), Branch Rickey Park (on Williams Street near levee), Buckeye Park (near Branch Rickey Park), Cyndee Secrest Park (Sciotoville), Dr. Hartlage Park (Rose Street in Sciotoville), Labold Park (near Spartan Stadium), Larry Hisle Park (23rd Street & Thomas Ave.), Mound Park (17th & Hutchins Streets), York Park (riverfront), Spartan Stadium, Tracy Park (Chillicothe & Gay Streets), and
Weghorst Park (Fourth & Jefferson Streets).

Portsmouth's Spock Community Dog Park, named after a K9 who died protecting his partner, was implemented in 2019 and is a recreational dog park that gives the community a place walk their dog and have leisure time.

A new skate-park, designed by Spohn Ranch Skateparks, is planned for construction in the near future.

Eugene Mckinley Memorial Pool, Dreamland Pool, and the Era of Jim Crow 

The Mckinley Swimming Pool, located on Findley St., was built during the Civil Rights era in memory of Eugene Mckinley, a 14 year old African American boy who drowned.

Portsmouth's other pool in the area (that has long since closed) was owned by the Terrace Club, and was commonly referred to as the "Dreamland Pool" by community members.

The Terrace Club's pool was still segregated despite the progress of the Civil Rights movement, which influenced the institutional make-up of Portsmouth, as well as protests across the nation. During the 1960s, Portsmouth made institutional changes to attempt to include the black community as well.

With the pool's construction being delayed and the African American community not having a place to swim in the area, despite the Civil Rights act having been passed, eventually a protest called the wade-in occurred at Dreamland Pool on July 17, 1964.

The next summer, in 1965, the Board of Directors of the Terrace Club pool unianimously removed their ban on African-Americans and reopened under the name Dreamland Pool.

The Mckinley Pool, which opened in 1966, still remains and stands as a historic pool that represents Portsmouth's reform, and the struggle against the laws of the Jim Crow Era.

Greenlawn Cemetery
This active cemetery was established in 1829. Greenlawn is 40 acres in size and is the only public cemetery in the city of Portsmouth. This cemetery incorporates several smaller cemeteries, which are sections of Greenlawn Cemetery. Sections included in Greenlawn Cemetery are: City, Evergreen, Hebrew, Holy Redeemer, Hill North (Methodist), Hill South (Robinson), Old Mausoleum, Soldiers Circle, and St. Marys. The cemetery is located at Offnere Street and Grant Street. It is maintained by the City of Portsmouth.

Floods and Floodwalls

Although developed on higher ground, the city has been subject to seasonal flooding. The city had extensive flooding in 1884, 1913, and 1937. After the flood of 1937, the U.S. Army Corps of Engineers constructed a floodwall protecting the city, which prevented two major floods in 1964 and 1997.

In 1992, the city of Portsmouth began honoring some of the many accomplishments of its area natives by placing a star on the riverside of the floodwall. This is known as the Portsmouth Wall of Fame and was instituted by then-mayor Frank Gerlach. Some of the honorees include Don Gullett, Al Oliver, and former United States Vice-president Dan Quayle, who was not a Portsmouth native.
 
In 1992 a nonprofit group headed by Dr. Louis R. and Ava Chaboudy was formed to investigate developing a mural-based tourist attraction on the floodwall. In the spring of 1993, mural artist Robert Dafford was commissioned and began painting murals of Portsmouth's history. He hired local art student Herb Roe as an assistant. Roe subsequently apprenticed to and worked for Dafford for 15 years. Subjects covered by the murals span the history of the area from the ancient mound building Adena and Hopewell cultures to modern sporting events and notable natives.

These subjects include
 The Portsmouth Earthworks, a large mound complex constructed by the Ohio Hopewell culture from 100 BCE to 500 CE.
 Lower Shawneetown, a Shawnee village that straddled the Ohio River just downstream during the late 18th century.
 The 1749 'Lead Plate Expedition' to advance France's territorial claim on the Ohio Valley, led by Pierre Joseph Céloron de Blainville.
 Tecumseh, a Shawnee leader who directed a large tribal confederacy that opposed the United States during Tecumseh's War and the War of 1812. He grew up in the Ohio country during the American Revolutionary War and the Northwest Indian War.
 Henry Massie, a founding father of the town and surveyor who laid out the original plat in 1803.
 A Civil War unit from Portsmouth, Battery L, fighting at Gettysburg
 Jim Thorpe, a Native American athlete who played as the player/coach of the semi-professional Portsmouth Shoesteels in the late 1920s.
 The Portsmouth Spartans, a member of the NFL from 1929 to 1933; the organization later moved to Detroit to become the Detroit Lions.
 Branch Rickey, influential baseball coach, inventor of the farm team system, and the signer of Jackie Robinson to Major League Baseball; Robinson broke the baseball color line when he debuted with the Brooklyn Dodgers in 1947.
 Clarence Holbrook Carter, an American Regionalist and surrealist painter.
 Carl Ackerman, local photographer and historic photo collector, whose collection was used for many of the river murals.
 The disastrous Ohio River flood of 1937, which led to the construction of the floodwall.
 Transportation – stagecoaches, riverboats, railroads and the Ohio and Erie Canal, which had its terminus just outside Portsmouth.
 Local notables including Roy Rogers, Jesse Stuart, Julia Marlowe, and Vern Riffe.
 Other panels explore the local history of education, the first European settlers, industries (including the steel industry, shoe industry, and the Portsmouth Gaseous Diffusion Plant), sister cities, the local Carnegie library, firemen and police, period genre scenes of old downtown and other localities, and a memorial to area armed forces veterans.

The original mural project was finished in the fall of 2003. Since then several additional panels have been added, including murals honoring Portsmouth's baseball heroes in 2006; and the Tour of the Scioto River Valley (TOSRV), a bicycle tour between Columbus and Portsmouth in 2007.

Indian Head Rock
The Indian Head Rock is an eight-ton sandstone boulder which until 2007 rested at the bottom of the Ohio River. Historically, the boulder was used to record low river stages. It is notable due to its history and due to the figures and names of individuals which were carved into the rock at times of low water levels. In 1917, the construction of a dam downriver from Portsmouth meant that the rock would forever be submerged, if not for its recovery by a group of local divers led by an Ironton historian. The removal of the rock led the states of Kentucky and Ohio into a legislative battle to determine its ownership and disposition. The rock was returned to the state of Kentucky in 2010.

Guinness World Records 
Portsmouth's leaders and citizens have organized to win certification for several Guinness World Records for the city of Portsmouth. In 2018, the "Friends Plant Portsmouth event participants shattered the record for the most persons simultaneously potting plants" while, later that year, Portsmouth beat out Waukesha, Wisconsin, the previous world record holder, for the most people simultaneously Christmas caroling which now stands at 1822 carolers. They also beat the previous record for most people wrapping Christmas presents simultaneously.

Professional sports 
Portsmouth had a series of semi-pro football teams in the 1920s and 1930s, the most notable being the Portsmouth Shoe-Steels, whose roster included player-coach Jim Thorpe.

From 1929 to 1933, the city was home to the Portsmouth Spartans, which joined the National Football League in 1930. The Spartans notably competed in the first professional football night game against the Brooklyn Dodgers in 1930. Despite their on-field success, being based in the NFL's second-smallest city during the Great Depression meant the team was in constant financial trouble. This forced the sale of the team and its relocation to Detroit in 1934, where it became the Detroit Lions.

In the late 20th century, the Portsmouth Explorers were one of the original teams in the Frontier League, a non-affiliated minor league baseball organization. The Explorers played in the league's first three seasons, from 1993 to 1995. In 1938, Portsmouth was also the home of the Portsmouth Red Birds, a minor league team owned by the St. Louis Cardinals.

In the late 1990s, Portsmouth was home to the Superstar Wrestling Federation before its demise. More recently Revolutionary Championship Wrestling has made its home in Portsmouth, airing on local TV station WQCW. Revolutionary Championship Wrestling in Portsmouth has featured such stars as Big Van Vader, Jerry "The King" Lawler, Demolition Ax, "Beautiful" Bobby Eaton, "Wildcat" Chris Harris, and Ivan Koloff.

Media
Portsmouth is near the dividing line for several television markets, including Columbus,
Cincinnati, and Huntington-Charleston. There are two local television stations including WTZP, an America One affiliate, and WQCW, a CW affiliate. Portsmouth was, prior to October 2017, served by WPBO, a PBS affiliate. Programs aired on WPBO were broadcast by WOSU in Columbus. Local radio stations  WIOI, WKSG, WNXT, WPYK, WZZZ, and WOSP-FM serve the radio listeners in the city.

Portsmouth is also served by three newspapers. The Portsmouth Daily Times is the city's only daily newspaper and is also available online.  The Community Common is a free biweekly newspaper and the Scioto Voice is a weekly newspaper, which is mailed to subscribers. The University Chronicle is the student-led newspaper at Shawnee State University.

Notable people

 James Mitchell Ashley - drafter of the Thirteenth Amendment to the United States Constitution
 Dale Bandy – Ohio University basketball coach
 Henry T. Bannon - U.S. representative from Portsmouth (1901-1905), attorney, author, and historian
 Kathleen Battle – opera singer
 Al Bridwell – former Major League Baseball player
 Gerald Cadogan – former Professional Football player
 Earl Thomas Conley – country music singer and songwriter
 Emma M. Cramer – member of the Ohio House of Representatives
 Mary A. G. Dight – physician
 Martin Dillon – musician and operatic tenor
 Bil Dwyer – cartoonist (Dumb Dora) and humorist
 Chuck Ealey – former football player for University of Toledo, and the Canadian Football League's Winnipeg Blue Bombers, Hamilton Tiger-Cats and Toronto Argonauts
 Steve Free – ASCAP Award-winning Appalachian musician
 Bill Harsha – Ohio politician for the U.S. House of
Representatives (1961–1981)
 Larry Hisle – former Major League Baseball player, currently employed with Milwaukee Brewers Organization
 Wells A. Hutchins - U.S. representative from Portsmouth (1883–1885), attorney
 Elza Jeffords – U.S. representative from Mississippi (1883–1885); practiced law in Portsmouth prior to the American Civil War
 Liza Johnson - film director
 Chase Wilmot Kennedy, U.S. Army major general
 Charles Kinney, Jr. - Ohio Secretary of State (1897-1901)
 Cheryl L. Mason — Chairman, Board of Veterans' Appeals, US Department of Veterans' Affairs (First woman to hold the office)
 Serena B. Miller - author
 Jeff Munn – Vice President of operations for Harlem Globetrotters
 Rocky Nelson – former Major League Baseball player
 Josh Newman – Major League Baseball pitcher
 Al Oliver – former Major League Baseball player
 Wally Phillips – longtime Chicago radio personality
 Del Rice - former Major League Baseball player
 Branch Rickey – baseball executive, signed Jackie Robinson to the Brooklyn Dodgers
 Barbara Robinson – author
 Herb Roe – mural artist
 Roy Rogers – singer and cowboy movie star
 Cheryl Shuman – Media Personality strategic political and media strategist 
 Stuff Smith – jazz musician
 Adam Stevens - 2 time champion crew chief with Kyle Busch in the NASCAR Sprint Cup Series Currently works with Christopher Bell
 Ted Strickland – former Ohio governor
 Gene Tenace – former Major League Baseball player

Sister cities

See also
List of cities and towns along the Ohio River

References

Further reading
Ann Hagedorn, Beyond the River The Untold Story of the Heroes of the Underground Railroad (New York: Simon & Schuster, 2002).

External links

 Official website

 
Cities in Ohio
Cities in Scioto County, Ohio
Populated places established in 1803
1803 establishments in Ohio